Kelly Altmann (born 27 April 1993) is an Australian netball player in the Suncorp Super Netball league, currently playing for the Collingwood Magpies.

Career
Altmann's elite-level career commenced in 2019 when she was signed by the Adelaide Thunderbirds in the Australian Super Netball league. She had been a training partner at the South Australian-based team for two seasons prior to being signed onto the senior list by the club ahead of the 2019 season. During her time as a training partner, Altmann was vice-captain for the Thunderbirds' reserves team, the Southern Force in the Australian Netball League. Altmann played every match for the club in 2019, though she was not re-signed by the club at the end of the season. She was signed by the Collingwood Magpies ahead of the 2020 season as an injury replacement player, replacing the long-term injured Kelsey Browne at the club.

Statistics
Statistics are correct to the end of the 2019 season.

|- style="background-color: #eaeaea"
! scope="row" style="text-align:center" | 2019
|style="text-align:center;"|Thunderbirds
| 0/0 || 100 || 0 || 2 || 171 || 2 || 10 || 85 || 31 || 14 
|- 
! scope="row" style="text-align:center" | 2020
|style="text-align:center;"|Magpies
| 0/0 || 0 || 0 || 0 || 0 || 0 || 0 || 0 || 0 || 0
|- class="sortbottom"
! colspan=2| Career
! 0/0
! 100
! 0
! 2
! 171
! 2
! 10
! 85
! 31
! 14
|}

References

External links
 Super Netball profile
 Netball Draft Central profile

1993 births
Australian netball players
Adelaide Thunderbirds players
Collingwood Magpies Netball players
Living people
Suncorp Super Netball players
Australian Netball League players
Southern Force (netball) players
Netball players from South Australia
Garville Netball Club players
South Australian Sports Institute netball players
South Australia state netball league players